The Battle of Caravaggio was fought near Caravaggio, in Lombardy (northern Italy), between the armies of the Ambrosian Republic (Milan's short lived republic) and the Republic of Venice, on 15 September 1448.

The commander of the Milanese army was the condottiero Francesco Sforza, who later, with the help of the same Venetian armies, would conquer Milan and establish himself as its duke.

References

1448 in Europe
1440s in the Holy Roman Empire
15th century in the Republic of Venice

Caravaggio
Caravaggio
Battles in Lombardy
Conflicts in 1448